The University of Texas at Austin was originally conceived in 1827 under an article in the Constitución de Coahuila y Texas to open a public university in the state of Texas. The Constitution of 1876 also called for the creation of a "university of the first class." Thus, they created "The University of Texas." Since the school's opening in 1883, the University of Texas has expanded greatly with the Austin institution remaining the flagship university of the University of Texas System. By the late 1990s, the University had the largest enrollment in the country and contained many of the country's top programs in the areas of law, architecture, film, engineering, and business.

Establishment
Upon Texas's independence, the Congress of the Republic of Texas adopted the Constitution of the Republic, which made its own provision to establish a system of public education in Texas. President Mirabeau B. Lamar's first speech to the Texas Congress iterated the need for education in a democracy; two weeks later, Ezekiel Cullen presented a report to the committee on education that contained a bill providing that twenty leagues of land be set aside for the support of a university. By the time Cullen's bill became a law on January 26, 1839, Congress had agreed to set aside fifty leagues of land. In addition,  in the new capital of Austin were reserved and designated "College Hill."
Congress failed to act any further until 1858, when lawmakers set out in the Act of 1858 $100,000 in United States bonds left from the Compromise of 1850 to put towards the university. In addition, the legislature designated land reserved for the encouragement of railroad construction toward the universities' fifty leagues. However, Texas's secession from the Union and the outbreak of the American Civil War prevented Congress from carrying out these plans.

After the war, the Constitution of 1876 mandated that the state establish the university "at an early day." The Constitution of 1876 also called for the creation of a "university of the first class." Thus, they created The University of Texas. It revoked the endowment of the railroad lands of the Act of 1858, but appropriated one million acres (4000 km²) in West Texas. In 1883, another two million acres (8,000 km²) was granted, with income from the sale of or grazing rights to the land going to The University of Texas. When mandating the creation of The University of Texas, the Texas Constitution had stated that it would "(include) an Agricultural, and Mechanical department."also pharmaceutical & engineering later on.

19th century
In 1881, Austin was chosen as the site of the "Main University," and Galveston was designated the location of the "Medical Department." In addition, the legislature authorized a governing board of eight regents. An official ceremony began construction on what is now referred to as the Old Main Building in late 1882 on the original "College Hill." The university finally opened its doors on September 15, 1883.

The old Victorian-Gothic Main Building served as the central point of the campus's  site, and was used for nearly all purposes. Built in three stages by architect F. E. Ruffini, the first was completed in 1883 for the University's first class; subsequent construction saw the creation of the central section in 1891 and the east wing in 1899. However, by the 1930s, discussions arose about the need for new library space, and the Main Building was razed in 1934 to much protest. The modern-day tower and Main Building were constructed in its place.

20th century
In 1910, George Washington Brackenridge donated 500 acres (2 km²), located on the Colorado River, to the university. A vote by the regents to move the campus was met with outrage. As a result, in 1921, the legislature appropriated $1,350,000 for the purchase of land adjacent to the main campus. Expansion, however, was hampered by the constitutional restriction against funding the construction of buildings. With the discovery of oil on university-owned grounds in 1923, the institution was able to put its new wealth towards its general endowment fund. These savings allowed the passing of amendments to make way for bond issues in 1931 and 1947, with the latter expansion necessary from the spike in enrollment following World War II. Temporary frame buildings were hastily constructed during this period, and the university built 19 permanent structures between 1950 and 1965. 

In 1965, the Texas Legislature granted the university Board of Regents to use eminent domain to purchase additional properties surrounding the original . In the Spring of 1965, the University began buying individual parcels of land to the north, south, and east of the existing campus, particularly in the Blackland neighborhood, in hopes of using the land to relocate the University's intramural fields, baseball field, tennis courts, and parking lots. The University Board of Regents focused on expansion eastward, as the east side's lower property values would lower the cost of acquisition. During the talks of annexation, the University and the City of Austin referred to Blackland neighborhood as the "Winn Tract" (named after an elementary school in the area), the "University East Project", or the Eastern Renewal Area". They had originally planned to annex all the land between I-35 and Chicon Street. However, following 12 years of negotiations, the Blackland Community Development Corporation (CDC) and the university reached a compromise, which allowed the annexation of the land between I-35 and Leona Street to build the Red and Charline McCombs Field and other auxiliary buildings; meanwhile, the University divested all of its previously-acquired property east of Leona Street back to the Blackland CDC.

On August 1, 1966, Charles Whitman barricaded himself on the observation deck of the tower of the Main Building with a sniper rifle and various other weapons, killed 14 people on campus, and wounded many more, before being shot and killed by police. Prior to the massacre, he killed his mother and his wife. Following the Whitman incident, the observation deck was closed until 1968, and then closed again in 1975 following a series of suicide jumps during the 1970s. In 1998, after installation of security and safety precautions, the tower observation deck reopened to the public. 

Completed in 1969, the two-building Jester Center was completed. At the time, it was the largest residence hall in North America and was the largest building project in university history.

The first presidential library on a university campus was dedicated on May 22, 1971 with former President Johnson, Lady Bird Johnson and then-President Richard Nixon in attendance. Constructed on the eastern side of the main campus, the Lyndon Baines Johnson Library and Museum is one of thirteen presidential libraries administered by the National Archives and Records Administration.

21st century
In the 2000s, the university experienced a wave of new construction. On April 30, 2006, the school opened a new  facility named the Blanton Museum of Art. The museum, the largest university art museum in the United States, is home to more than 17,000 works from Europe, the United States and Latin America. In August 2008, the AT&T Executive Education and Conference Center opened for conferences, seminars and continuing education and executive-education programs. The hotel and conference center are part of a new gateway to the university extending the South Mall. Later the same month, after three years of renovations were completed, Darrell K Royal–Texas Memorial Stadium became the largest stadium (by seating capacity) in the state of Texas. In addition to numerous improvements, DKR now seats 100,119, up from the previous 94,113. In 2008, demolition of the old Experimental Sciences Building (ESB) was completed and construction began on a replacement to be named the Norman Hackerman Building (NHB) in honor and memory of Dr. Norman Hackerman, chemist, professor and president emeritus.

References

University of Texas at Austin
Texas at Austin